Michèle Wolf may refer to:
 Michèle Wolf (fencer)
 Michèle Wolf (footballer)

See also
 Michelle Wolf, American comedian and writer
 Michelle Wolff, American actress